Slash-and-char is an alternative to slash-and-burn that has a lesser effect on the environment. It is the practice of charring the biomass resulting from the slashing, instead of burning it. The resulting residue matter charcoal can be utilized as biochar to improve the soil fertility.

In that context, charcoal can be made by numerous and varied methods, from the simplest (burning a pile of biomass by lighting it on the top (Top Down Burn / Conservation Burn) or an earth cover on the pile of wood, with strategically placed vents) to the most sophisticated (a modern equipment or plant that recuperates and processes strictly all exhaust gases into pyroligneous acid and syngas).

Slash-and-char offers benefits to the environment when compared to slash-and-burn.

It results in the creation of biochar, which can then be mixed with biomass such as crop residues, food waste, or manure, and buried in the soil to bring about the formation of terra preta. Terra preta is one of the richest soils on the planet – and the only one known to regenerate itself.

It moreover sequesters considerable quantities of carbon in the safest and most beneficial fashion, as opposite to the negative effects of the slash-and-burn. Switching to slash-and-char can sequester up to 50% of the carbon in a highly stable form.
The nascent carbon trading market that sponsors  sequestration projects, could therefore help supplement the farmers' income while supporting a decrease in the pace of deforestation and the development of a more sustainable agriculture.

See also
Biomass, explaining some of these methods and advantages.

References

External links

Sustainable agriculture
Tropical agriculture
Deforestation
Forest management
Soil improvers